The Riverside Ground is a cricket ground in Chester-le-Street, County Durham. It is the home of Durham County Cricket Club and has hosted Test, One Day International (ODI) and Twenty20 International (T20I) matches. It has a capacity of 17,000 spectators for international matches, for which temporary stands are erected.  The Riverside hosted six Test matches between 2003, when England played Zimbabwe, and 2016. It hosted its first ODI in 1999 when Pakistan defeated Scotland by 94 runs in the qualifying round of that year's Cricket World Cup, and T20Is have been played at the ground since 2008. Women's ODI and T20I matches have also been played on the ground.

In cricket, a five-wicket haul (also known as a "five-for" or "fifer") refers to a bowler taking five or more wickets in a single innings. This is regarded as a notable achievement.   The first bowler to take a five-wicket haul in a Test match at the Riverside Ground was Richard Johnson in 2003 who, making his Test debut for England against Zimbabwe, finished with bowling figures of 6 wickets for 33 runs. These remained the best Test bowling figures at the Riverside until 2013 when Australia's Ryan Harris took 7 wickets for 117 runs in the fourth Test against England. Stuart Broad is the only bowler to have taken two five-wicket hauls in Test matches at the ground, doing so in the same Test match, also making him the only bowler to have taken ten wickets in an international match at the Riverside. , nine bowlers have taken ten Test match five-wicket hauls at the ground; every Test match in which a five-wicket haul has been taken at the Riverside Ground has resulted in an England victory.

As of August 2015, two bowlers have taken five-wicket hauls during ODIs at the Riverside.  New Zealand's medium pace bowler James Franklin took 5 wickets for 42 runs against England during their tour in 2004 and England's Graeme Swann achieved 5 for 28 against Australia in the final ODI of the 2009 NatWest Series. No five-wicket hauls have been taken in T20I cricket or in Women's international matches on the ground.

Key

Tests
A total of 11 five-wicket hauls were taken in the six Test matches played on the ground.

One Day International five-wicket hauls

Two five-wicket hauls have been taken in ODIs on the ground.

References

External links
International five-wicket hauls at the Riverside Ground, CricInfo

Riverside Stadium